Trichocerca is a genus of rotifers belonging to the family Trichocercidae.

The genus has cosmopolitan distribution.

Species:
 Trichocerca abilioi Segers & Sarma, 1993 
 Trichocerca agnatha Wulfert, 1939

References

Ploima